Hooglandia ignambiensis is a species of trees in the family Cunoniaceae. It is endemic to New Caledonia and the only species of the genus Hooglandia. It is named after Dutch botanist Ruurd Dirk Hoogland.

References

Cunoniaceae
Flora of New Caledonia
Endemic flora of New Caledonia
Monotypic Oxalidales genera